Spiraea chamaedryfolia, common name germander meadowsweet or elm-leaved spirea, is a species of plant belonging to the family Rosaceae.

Description
Branchlets are brownish or red-brown. The white flowers of 6–9 mm in diameter grow in spikelike clusters at the ends of the branches. Flowering period extends from May to September.

Distribution
This species is native to the mixed forests and forest clearings of South Eastern Europe and Asia (China, Japan, Korea, Mongolia, Russia and Europe).

References

External links
Catalogue of Life

chamaedryfolia